Cha Lo Border Gate Economic Zone is a special economic zone in Quảng Bình Province, Vietnam. This zone is located at the border gate between Laos's Khammouane Province and Vietnam's Quảng Bình Province.
Total area is 538 km2, including 5 communes Dân Hoá, Hóa Thanh, Hóa Tiến, Hóa Phúc and Hồng Hoá.  It's connected by road through National Road 12. Preferential investment and taxation are given to the investors and businessmen here.

The management organization of this special economic zone is the Management Unit for Quảng Bình Economic Zones.

See also
Hòn La Economic Zone

References

External links
Khu kinh tế cửa khẩu Cha Lo.
Khu kinh tế cửa khẩu Cha Lo.
establishment of Cha Lo Economic Zone

Quảng Bình province
Foreign trade of Vietnam
Special economic zones